The Big Bang Theory is an American situation comedy created, produced, and written by Chuck Lorre and Bill Prady. The show premiered on CBS on September 24, 2007. The twelfth and final season of the show concluded on May 16, 2019.

The Big Bang Theory received mixed reviews from critics throughout its first season, but reception was more favorable in the next seasons. It was nominated for several awards, including for the Primetime Emmy Award for Outstanding Comedy Series, four times from 2011 to 2014.

Total nominations and awards for the cast

Bravo Otto
Established in 1957, the Bravo Otto is a German accolade presented by the Bravo magazine. 

!
|-
!scope="row"|2019
|rowspan=“1”|The Big Bang Theory
|rowspan="1"|Best Series
|
| style="text-align:center;"|
|}

Critics' Choice Television Awards

Golden Globe Awards

MTV Millennial Awards Brazil

!
|-
! scope="row" |2018
|The Big Bang Theory
| Series of the Year
| 
| 
|}

Nickelodeon Kids Choice Awards

Online Film Critics Society Awards

People's Choice Awards

Primetime Emmy Awards
Since 2009, The Big Bang Theory has been nominated for 46 Primetime Emmy Awards (including the Creative Arts Emmy Awards), more than any other award it received.
Jim Parsons has been nominated for more Emmy Awards than any other cast member in the show for his role as Sheldon, and is the only main actor to win one. In 2010, Parsons won an Emmy Award for Outstanding Lead Actor in a Comedy Series, and then won for a second consecutive year in 2011. He subsequently won the Outstanding Lead Actor in a Comedy Series again in 2013 and repeated in 2014. However, the show has only won ten Emmy Awards in total.

Satellite Awards

Screen Actors Guild Awards

Television Critics Association Awards

Teen Choice Awards

Other awards

References

Awards
Big Bang Theory